Chandaus is a small town located in Aligarh district of Uttar Pradesh, India. Chandaus is one of the 12 Blocks in Aligarh district. 
Chandaus is located on the Deorau-Pisawa main road. The nearest railway station is Danwar (6.5 km).

Nearby places
Nearby towns to Chandaus are [Chimanpur] Gabhana, Pisawa, Khurja, Khair, Jattari, Tappal, Jewar and Bajna.

Nearby major cities
Khair (19km),
Khurja (20km),
Bulandshahar (39km),
Aligarh (38km),
Greater Noida (62km),
Palwal (65km),
Mathura (80km).
[Pisawa]  (10km)
Chimanpur (02km)

References

Cities and towns in Aligarh district